Walther Hasemann (18 October 1900 – 20 November 1976) was a German politician of the Free Democratic Party (FDP) and former member of the German Bundestag.

Life 
Hasemann was a member of the German Bundestag from its first election in 1949 to 1953. He had entered parliament via the state list of the FDP Lower Saxony.

Literature

References

1900 births
1976 deaths
Members of the Bundestag for Lower Saxony
Members of the Bundestag 1949–1953
Members of the Bundestag for the Free Democratic Party (Germany)